Byrd Creek is a stream in Cape Girardeau County, Missouri. The stream is a tributary of the Whitewater River.

The stream headwaters arise at  just east of Oak Ridge at an elevation of approximately 585 feet. The stream flows to the south and south-southwest crossing under Missouri Route 72 between Millersville and Jackson and under Missouri Route 34 east of Burfordville. The stream reaches its confluence with the Whitewater River approximately three miles south of Burfordville.

Byrd Creek has the name of Amos Byrd, a pioneer citizen.

See also
List of rivers of Missouri

References

Rivers of Cape Girardeau County, Missouri
Rivers of Missouri